Star Wars: Clone Wars or The Clone Wars are titles of various series of comics set in the Star Wars universe during the Clone Wars conflict. Dark Horse Comics published a nine-volume series of trade paperbacks (2003–2006) collecting various comics dealing with the conflict, a ten-volume graphic-novella series titled Clone Wars: Adventures (2004–2007) in the style of the 2D animated series, and both a monthly comic book series (2008–2010) and a quarterly graphic-novella series (2008–2013) tying into the 3D animated series. A series of webcomics were also released on starwars.com (2008-2011).

Trade paperbacks (2003–2006) 

The parts of the series are as follows.

Clone Wars: Volume 1 – The Defense of Kamino 
Sacrifice
written by John Ostrander
pencilled by Jan Duursema
The Defense of Kamino
Brothers in Arms
written by John Ostrander
pencilled by Jan Duursema
inked by Dan Parsons
Jango's Legacy
written by Haden Blackman
pencilled by Stephen Thompson
inked by Ray Kryssing
No End in Sight
written by Scott Allie
pencilled by Tomás Giorello
inked by Ray Kryssing
Schism
written by John Ostrander
pencilled by Jan Duursema
inked by Dan Parsons

The events in this story take place between two and three months after the Battle of Geonosis (as seen in Star Wars: Attack of the Clones). 

This trade paperback collects Republic 49 and 50 and Jedi: Mace Windu.

Clone Wars: Volume 2 – Victories and Sacrifices 
The New Face of War
written by Haden Blackman
pencilled by Tomás Giorello
inks by Curtis Arnold
colors by Joe Wayne
Blast Radius
written by Haden Blackman
pencilled by Brian Ching
inks by Joe Weems
colors by Joe Wayne
Catspaw
written by John Ostrander
pencilled by Jan Duursema
inked by Dan Parsons
colors by Joe Wayne

The events in this story take place between ten weeks and five months after the Battle of Geonosis (as seen in Attack of the Clones)

This trade paperback collects Republic 51 to 53 and Jedi: Shaak Ti.

Clone Wars: Volume 3 – Last Stand on Jabiim 
Blood and Rain
written by Haden Blackman
pencilled by Brian Ching 
inks by Victor Llamas
colors by Joe Wayne
Thunder and Lightning
written by Haden Blackman
pencilled by Brian Ching
inks by Victor Llamas
The Storm After the Storm
written by John Ostrander
pencilled by Jan Duursema
inks by Dan Parsons

The events in this story take place between six and seventeen months after the Battle of Geonosis (as seen in Attack of the Clones)

This trade paperback collects Republic 55 to 59.

Clone Wars: Volume 4 – Light and Dark 
The events in this story take place between six and seventeen months after the Battle of Geonosis (as seen in Attack of the Clones)
written by John Ostrander
pencilled by Jan Duursema
inked by Dan Parsons
colored by Brad Anderson

This trade paperback collects Republic 54, Jedi: Aayla Secura and Jedi: Dooku, and Republic 63.

Clone Wars: Volume 5 – The Best Blades 
Dead Ends
written by John Ostrander
pencilled by Brandon Badeaux
inked by Armando Durruthy
Bloodlines
written by John Ostrander
art by Brandon Badeaux
Hate and Fear
written by Haden Blackman
art by Tomás Giorello
No Man's Land
written by Haden Blackman
art by Tomás Giorello
The Best Blades
written by Jeremy Barlow
art by HOON, Ramiro Montanez and Stacy Michalcewicz

The events in this story take place between fifteen and seventeen months after the Battle of Geonosis (as seen in Attack of the Clones)

This trade paperback collects Republic 61, 64, 60, 62 and Jedi: Yoda.

Clone Wars: Volume 6 – On The Fields of Battle 
Show of Force
written by John Ostrander
pencilled by Jan Duursema
inked by Dan Parsons
Forever Young
written by Randy Stradley
art by Brandon Badeaux
Armor
written by John Ostrander
pencilled by Jan Duursema
inks by Dan Parsons
Dreadnaughts of Rendili
written by John Ostrander
pencilled by Jan Duursema
inks by Dan Parsons

The events in this story take place beginning seventeen months after the Battle of Geonosis (as seen in Attack of the Clones)

This trade paperback collects Republic 65 to 71.

Clone Wars: Volume 7 – When They Were Brothers 
Obsession
script by Haden Blackman
art by Brian Ching

script by Miles Lane
art by Nicola Scott

The events in this story begin five months before Revenge of the Sith.

This trade paperback collects Obsession 1 to 5 and the 2005 Free Comic Book Day special

Clone Wars: Volume 8 – Last Siege, The Final Truth 
Trackdown
script by John Ostrander
pencils by Jan Duursema
inks by Dan Parsons
Siege of Saleucami
script by John Ostrander
pencils by Jan Duursema
inks by Dan Parsons

The events in this story begin six months before Revenge of the Sith.

This trade paperback collects Republic 72 to 77.

Clone Wars: Volume 9 – Endgame 
Hidden Enemy
script by John Ostrander
pencilled by Jan Duursema
inks by Dan Parsons
colors by Brad Anderson
Into the Unknown
script by Welles Hartley
pencilled by Douglas Wheatley
colors by Chris Chuckry
Purge
script by John Ostrander
pencilled by Douglas Wheatley
colors by Ronda Pattison

The events in this story begin during the events of Revenge of the Sith

This trade paperback collects Republic 81 to 83, 79 and 80 and one-shot Purge.

Clone Wars: Adventures (2004–2007) 
Clone Wars: Adventures ran from 2004 to 2007 and features art based on the 2D animated series (2003–2005). The volumes are numbered 1–10 and not individually titled.

Monthly series (2008–2010)

The Clone Wars: Slaves of the Republic 
Star Wars: The Clone Wars #1–6
Creator: Henry Gilroy
Penciller: Scott Hepburn, Ramón Pérez, Lucas Marangon
Inker: Dan Parsons
Colorist: Michael E. Wiggam

Tie in to TV Series:

Clone Trooper Waxer, from the episodes "Innocents of Ryloth" and "Landing at Point Rain", makes a brief cameo in this comic.

The Clone Wars: In Service of the Republic 
Star Wars: The Clone Wars #7–9
Writer: Henry Gilroy, Steven Melching
Penciller: Scott Hepburn
Inker: Dan Parsons
Colorist: Michael E. Wiggam
Cover Artist: Ramón Pérez

Tie in to TV series:

Brings back clone commander Wolffe. It tells how Wolffe lost his eye when he is seen in "Grievous Intrigue". This is also the first time he is seen in clone armor with a wolf emblazoned on his helmet. Also, Clone trooper Sinker, from the "Rising Malevolence" episode makes a brief cameo in the book.

The Clone Wars: Hero of the Confederacy 
Star Wars: The Clone Wars #10–12
Writer: Henry Gilroy, Steven Melching
Penciller: Brian Koschak
Inker: Dan Parsons
Colorist: Michael E. Wiggam

Graphic novellas (2008–2013)

The Clone Wars: Shipyards of Doom 
Writer: Henry Gilroy
Artist: Matt and Shawn Fillbach
Colorist: Ronda Pattisong

The Clone Wars: Crash Course 
Writer: Henry Gilroy
Penciller: Matt and Shawn Fillbach
Colorist: Ronda Pattison
Cover Artist: Ramon Perez

The Clone Wars: The Wind Raiders of Taloraan 
Writer: John Ostrander
Artist: Wayne Lo

The Clone Wars: The Colossus of Destiny 
Writer: Jeremy Barlow
Artist: Matt and Shawn Fillbach

The Clone Wars: Deadly Hands of Shon-Ju 
Writer: Jeremy Barlow
Artist: Brian Koschak
Colorist: Ronda Pattison

The Clone Wars: The Starcrusher Trap 
Writer: Mike Barr
Artist: Matt and Shawn Fillbach
Colorist: Raymond Lee
Cover Artist: Matt and Shawn Fillbach

The Clone Wars: Strange Allies 
Writer: Ryder Windham
Artist: Ben Dewey
Colorist: Mae Hao
Cover Artist: Stephane Roux

The Clone Wars: The Enemy Within 
Writer: Jeremy Barlow
Artist: Brian Koschak
Colorist: Mae Hao
Cover Artist: Brain Koschek

The Clone Wars: The Sith Hunters 
Writer: Henry Gilroy, Steven Melching
Artist: Vicenç Villagrasa
Colorist: Vicante Ibañez
Cover Artist: Dave Filoni

The Clone Wars: Defenders of the Lost Temple 
Writer: Justin Aclin
Artist: Ben Bates
Colorist: Michael Atiyeh
Cover Artist: Mike Hawthorne

The Clone Wars: The Smuggler's Code 
Writer: Justin Aclin
Artist: Eduardo Ferrara
Colorist: Michael Atiyeh
Cover Artist: Bengal

Webcomics (2008–2011) 
 Writers: Pablo Hidalgo, Henry Gilroy, Thomas Hodges
 Artists: Jeffery Carlisle, Katie Cook, Grant Gould, Thomas Hodges, Daniel Falconer, Jeffery Carlisle

The first comics were released coinciding with Season One. To bridge the arc between the seasons, several comics titled Hunting the Hunters and corresponding online games were released. For the second and third seasons, the comics developed into an ongoing story of its own occasionally weaving into the TV series' storylines. A collection, Star Wars: Tales from The Clone Wars Webcomic Collection Season 1, was published by Dreams and Visions Press with Dark Horse Books in 2010.

Season One 
 The Clone Wars: Prelude: set right before "Ambush"
 The Clone Wars: Shakedown: set right before "Rising Malevolence"
 The Clone Wars: Procedure: set right before "Shadow of Malevolence"
 The Clone Wars: Agenda: set right before "Destroy Malevolence"
 The Clone Wars: Mouse Hunt: set right before "Rookies"
 The Clone Wars: The Fall of Falleen: set right before "Downfall of a Droid"
 The Clone Wars: Discount: set right before "Duel of the Droids"
 The Clone Wars: Departure: set right before "Bombad Jedi"
 The Clone Wars: Transfer: set right before "Cloak of Darkness"
 The Clone Wars: The Dreams of General Grievous: set right before "Lair of Grievous"
 The Clone Wars: Bait: set right before "Dooku Captured"
 The Clone Wars: Switch: set right before "The Gungan General"
 The Clone Wars: Headgames: set some time before "Jedi Crash"
 The Clone Wars: Neighbors: set during "Jedi Crash"
 The Clone Wars: Cold Snap: set right before "Trespass"
 The Clone Wars: Shadowed: set right before "The Hidden Enemy"
 The Clone Wars: The Valley: set right before "Blue Shadow Virus" and "Mystery of a Thousand Moons"
 The Clone Wars: Covetous: set before "Storm Over Ryloth"
 The Clone Wars: Curfew: set before "Innocents of Ryloth"
 The Clone Wars: The Ballad of Cham Syndulla: set before "Liberty on Ryloth"
 The Clone Wars: Invitation Only: set before "Hostage Crisis"
 The Clone Wars: Hunting the Hunters (Part I), released with Gunship Over Florrum
 The Clone Wars: Hunting the Hunters (Part II), released with Swamp Station Sweep
 The Clone Wars: Hunting the Hunters (Part III), released with Droids Over Iego
 The Clone Wars: Act on Instinct
 The Clone Wars: The Valsedian Operation

Photo comics 

 Star Wars: Clone Wars, a 2008 photo comic adaptation of the 2003-2005 tv series

See also
 List of Star Wars comic books

References

Clone Wars